"The Russians are coming" is a phrase attributed to United States Secretary of Defense James Forrestal in 1949. In full, Forrestal said "The Russians are coming. The Russians are coming. They're right around. I've seen Russian soldiers."

Forrestal allegedly uttered those words while suffering from mental illness, not long before committing suicide.  The allegation originated with Forrestal's bitter political enemy, columnist Drew Pearson, and has been verified by no other person.  This is what Townsend Hoopes and Douglas Brinkley have to say about the episode in their 1992 book, Driven Patriot, the Life and Times of James Forrestal:

Since then the phrase has been used in various contexts.

See also
 "The British are coming"

References 

American political catchphrases
1940s neologisms
Cold War terminology